Art Ginsburg (July 29, 1931 – November 21, 2012), commonly known as Mr. Food, was an American television chef and best selling author of cookbooks (not to be confused with the comedy character Mr Food on BBC Radio's Steve Wright In The Afternoon). He was known for ending each of his TV segments with the catch phrase "Ooh! It's so good!" The signature phrase, as spoken by Mr. Food, is registered as a sound trademark with the U.S. Patent and Trademark Office. 
Ginsburg was a pioneer of "quick & easy cooking" who, for over 30 years, paved the way for other TV food personalities to follow. With his enthusiastic style, Mr. Food specialized in practical food preparation techniques, using readily available ingredients. He extolled an "anybody can do it" philosophy of cooking and remains today as one of the early pioneers of cooking on modern television.

Career
Ginsburg was originally a butcher. He owned and ran a catering business prior to his work in television.  In 1975, Ginsburg turned his flair for acting into a local television food program at WRGB in Schenectady, New York. It is believed that he filmed 1 or 2 episodes at KWWL in Waterloo, Iowa. By 1980, his 90-second Mr. Food segments were being syndicated to nine U.S. television markets, including WKBN-TV in Youngstown, Ohio, which still airs the "Mr. Food's Test Kitchen" segments today. At its peak in 2007, the program appeared on 168 television stations through King World Productions.

In addition to his television career, Ginsburg became a prolific writer, with 52 cookbooks published and sales of over 8 million copies. Three of Ginsburg's cookbooks were devoted to recipes for people with diabetes and published by the American Diabetes Association; one of these has also been published in Spanish. For his other cookbooks, he teamed with such notable publishers as William Morrow and Company, HarperCollins, Chicken Soup for the Soul Enterprises, and Oxmoor House, a division of Southern Progress Corporation and Time Warner. Since 2009, Mr. Food brand has self-published their own books.

Ginsburg was a co-host of the annual Variety Kids Telethon at WKBW-TV (a Mr. Food affiliate) in Buffalo, New York, to raise funds for Children's Hospital.

As he aged, Ginsburg stepped away from most of the daily operations of his company, Ginsburg Enterprises Incorporated. In addition to the Mr. Food segments, the company produced other segments called "Mr. Food's Test Kitchen" (in which he did not appear). It also produced his line of cookware.

Death 
Ginsburg was diagnosed with pancreatic cancer in 2011. He underwent treatments, including surgery, which caused the cancer to go into remission. However, it returned in early November 2012. Ginsburg died at his home that he shared with his wife Ethel in Weston, Florida, on November 21, 2012. He was 81. On November 23, memorial services were held at B'nai Aviv Synagogue in Weston and he was buried at Beth David Memorial Gardens in Hollywood, Florida.

Legacy
"Mr. Food's Test Kitchen" continues on most of the stations that originally carried Mr. Food, with Howard Rosenthal (chief operating officer of Ginsburg Enterprises) as the series' primary host.

References

External links
 Mr. Food Test Kitchen consumer website
 Mr. Food corporate website
 Example recipe
 Mr. Food no-fuss Meals
 

1931 births
2012 deaths
American male chefs
American television chefs
20th-century American Jews
Writers from Troy, New York
Deaths from pancreatic cancer
Deaths from cancer in Florida
People from Weston, Florida
21st-century American Jews
American gastronomes